Vapor Trail is a roller coaster built by Vekoma at Sesame Place in Langhorne, Pennsylvania. It is a custom steel roller coaster designed for families.

Summary

Height and age requirements 
Riders must be 3 years of age or older.

Queue
As the guests enter the queue, they see various large comic pictures of Super Grover.

Ride experience
Once the guests are seated with their lap bars lowered, Super Grover exclaims, "Hello superheroes! We are cleared for takeoff!". After the train dispatches the station, it ascends up the lift hill. As it nears the top, Super Grover says "Okay, here we go! Wave to your mommies and daddies!", followed by a winding drop and multiple helixes. When the vehicle comes to a brake run before heading back to the station, Super Grover then says, "Yes, watch out! Coming home! Hey Mama!" before returning to the station.

References

External links
 

Roller coasters introduced in 1998
Roller coasters in Pennsylvania
Roller coasters operated by SeaWorld Parks & Entertainment
1998 establishments in Pennsylvania